Manus Trench is an oceanic trench in the Bismarck Sea north of Papua New Guinea delineating the plate tectonic boundary between the Caroline and North Bismarck plates.

There very moderate seismic activity along both these trenches, and their status as an active subduction zone has been challenged.

The Kilinailau Trench east of New Ireland forms the continuation to the Manus Trench and is thought to mark the boundary between the Pacific and North Bismarck plates.  It is, however, disputed whether the Caroline Plate moves independently from the Pacific Plate.  If not, the Manus and Kilinailau trenches form the Pacific-North Bismarck boundary together.

Perpendicular to the two trenches is another trench, the Mussau Trench separating the Caroline Plate and Pacific Plate.

References
 Notes

 Sources
 

Tectonic plates
Geology of the Pacific Ocean
Subduction zones